Goodbye or  Tot Ziens!  is a 1995 Dutch film directed by Heddy Honigmann.

Cast
Johanna ter Steege	... 	Laura
Guy Van Sande	... 	Jan
Els Dottermans	... 	Ann
Warre Borgmans	... 	Walter
Nelleke Zitman	... 	Ine
Stefan van de Staak	... 	Stefan
Cas Enklaar	... 	Dassenverkoper
Bart Klever	... 	Loketbeamte
Johan van Assche	... 	Journalist Brussel
Saskia Temmink	... 	Barbara
Nina Spijkers	... 	Clara

Reference

External links 
 

1995 films
Dutch drama films
1990s Dutch-language films
Films directed by Heddy Honigmann
1995 drama films